The 1991–92 UCLA Bruins men's basketball team represented the University of California, Los Angeles in the 1991–92 NCAA Division I men's basketball season. Jim Harrick coached his fourth year for the Bruins. The Bruins started the season ranked 11th in the AP Poll and beat the #2 Indiana Hoosiers, 87–72, in their season opener at the Hall of Fame Tip-Off Classic (Springfield, Massachusetts). This UCLA squad won their first 14 games, which was their best start since John Wooden's 1972–73 team. For the first time since the 1986–87 season, the Bruins were Pac-10 conference champions with a 16–2 conference record (there was no Pac-10 tournament that year). The Bruins were given a #1 seed in the NCAA Tournament that year, but lost to Indiana in the Elite Eight, 79-106. UCLA finished ranked 3rd and 4th in the UPI and AP Polls respectively.

Starting lineup

Roster

Schedule

|-
!colspan=9 style=|Regular Season

|-
!colspan=12 style="background:#;"| NCAA tournament

Source

Notes
The 27-point loss to the Hoosiers in the tournament would go down as the worst loss (by margin of defeat) in UCLA's NCAA Tournament history. UCLA had beaten this Indiana Hoosiers squad in the first game of the season.

References

UCLA Bruins men's basketball seasons
Ucla
Ucla
NCAA
NCAA